Mitchell Squire (born 1958) is an American installation artist, sculptor, and performance artist.  He was born in Natchez, Mississippi.  He primarily focuses on exploring culture through acquired artifacts and the inability to express pain. Squire is currently a professor at Iowa State University and lives in Ames, Iowa. Squire's work is held in the collections of the Minneapolis Institute of Art.

Regarding Squire's "Gladiators" exposition, the Minneapolis Institute of Art wrote:
From afar, the large, striking lithograph seems to depict a collection of elegant translucent perfume bottles. Upon closer inspection, the black silhouettes reveal themselves as law enforcement targets—faceless black male torsos—in an arbitrary pile suggestive of a mass grave, the bodies too numerous to count.

Another installation features a law enforcement paper gun range targets riddled with bullet holes.

Squire has a B.A. in architecture and M.Arch. from Iowa State University.

Exhibition history

Solo exhibitions 
 2014 - Bemis Center for Contemporary Arts, Mitchell Squire:  We're gonna have to do more than talk | Carver Bank, 11 January - 29 March
 2012 - London, White Cube Gallery, Mitchell Squire: Inside the White Cube, 7 September - 11 November
 2011 - New York, CUE Art Foundation, Mitchell Squire: no 'nother country, 19 November - 14 January 2012 (catalogue)
 2010 - Berkeley, University of California, Berkeley, Wurster Gallery, Mitchell Squire, TOYZ: and other thoughtful objects for hours of play, 17 November - 3 December
 2009 - Ann Arbor, University of Michigan,Taubman College Gallery, Mitchell Squire, TOYZ: and other thoughtful objects for hours of play, 15 February - 29 March
 2005 - Des Moines, Drake University, Anderson Gallery, Mitchell Squire: Still Life with Peaches (and a little black boy atop a spotted pony), 10 November - 11 December

Group exhibitions
 2011 - New York, New Museum, Museum as Hub: Alpha's Bet Is Not Over Yet, 12 October - 4 December

Select collections 
 Des Moines Art Center
 Minneapolis Institute of Art

Editioned prints 
 Gladiators, 2013 Mitchell Squire; Publisher: World House Editions, Middlebury, Conn., Lithograph The Barbara S. Longfellow fund for works on Paper 2014.26

Residencies 
 2010 - Skowhegan School of Painting and Sculpture, Maine

Awards 
 2010 - Midwestern Voices and Visions award; Alliance of Artists Communities
 2009 - ACSA Creative Achievement Award: Course "Craft and Crafty Action:  On The Relationship Between Creativity and Mischief"
 2005 - Association of Collegiate Schools of Architecture (ACSA) New Faculty Teaching Award

External links
 Mitchell Squire in the Minneapolis Institute of Art, Minneapolis, MN

References

1958 births
20th-century African-American people
21st-century African-American people
American contemporary artists
African-American artists
Artists from Mississippi
Living people